In mathematics, the y-homeomorphism, or crosscap slide, is a special type of auto-homeomorphism in non-orientable surfaces.

It can be constructed by sliding a Möbius band included on the surface 
around an essential 1-sided closed curve until the original position; thus it is necessary that the surfaces have genus greater than one. The projective plane  has no y-homeomorphism.

See also
Lickorish-Wallace theorem

References

J. S. Birman, D. R. J. Chillingworth, On the homeotopy group of a non-orientable surface, Trans. Amer. Math. Soc. 247 (1979), 87-124.
D. R. J. Chillingworth, A finite set of generators for the homeotopy group of a non-orientable surface, Proc. Camb. Phil. Soc. 65 (1969), 409–430. 
M. Korkmaz, Mapping class group of non-orientable surface, Geometriae Dedicata 89 (2002), 109–133.
W. B. R. Lickorish, Homeomorphisms of non-orientable two-manifolds, Math. Proc. Camb. Phil. Soc. 59 (1963), 307–317.

Geometric topology
Homeomorphisms